The Revolutionary Marxist Current (CMR) is a Trotskyist tendency within the United Socialist Party of Venezuela (PSUV).

Ideology 
The CMR's position is that of support for the Bolivarian Revolution, while pointing out that the only way forward for the revolution is the nationalization of the commanding heights of the economy under workers' control. Also they think that a big section of the bureaucracy of the PSUV is the "Fifth Column" of the Bolivarian Revolution.

The CMR is active in factory occupations through FRETECO. It has led the struggles in Inveval and Mitsubishi, while it has a presence in the student and trade union movement. The CMR describes itself as "The Marxist Voice of the PSUV".

History 
In 2010, the CMR, along with groups in Spain and Mexico, broke with the International Marxist Tendency and formed their own international grouping under the name  (Revolutionary Left) also known by the name of their newspaper, . In 2016,  announced joint work with the Committee for a Workers International. In Venezuela they merged with the CWI section Revolutionary Socialism (Venezuela).

References

External links 
Revolutionary Marxist Current Website

Bolivarian Revolution
United Socialist Party of Venezuela
Venezuela
Trotskyist organizations in Venezuela